Folksy Nina is an album by singer/pianist/songwriter Nina Simone. It includes live tracks recorded on April 12, 1963, at Carnegie Hall. The previous album, Nina Simone at Carnegie Hall (1963) uses songs from the same concert. It was released on Colpix Records.

Track listing
 "Silver City Bound" (Huddie Ledbetter, Alan Lomax)
 "When I Was a Young Girl" (Sebastian Mure)
 "Erets Zavat Chalav" (Eliahu Gamliel)
 "Lass of the Low Country" (Traditional)
 "The Young Knight" (Joseph Hathaway, Charles Kingsly)
 "The Twelfth of Never" (Jerry Livingston, Paul Francis Webster)
 "Vanetihu" (Gil Aldema)
 "You Can Sing a Rainbow" (Arthur Hamilton)
 "Hush Little Baby" (Pete Seeger)

Remark: Track 8 is sometimes listed as "Mighty Lak' a Rose" (music by Ethelbert Nevin, lyrics by Frank Lebby Stanton). "When I Was a Young Girl" was later covered by Julie Driscoll (as "When I was Young") on her 1969 album Streetnoise, under the assumption it was a traditional tune.

References

1964 live albums
Nina Simone live albums
Albums arranged by Nina Simone
Colpix Records live albums
Albums recorded at Carnegie Hall